= Rustic Inn =

Coordinates: 26.06853°N 80.169°W

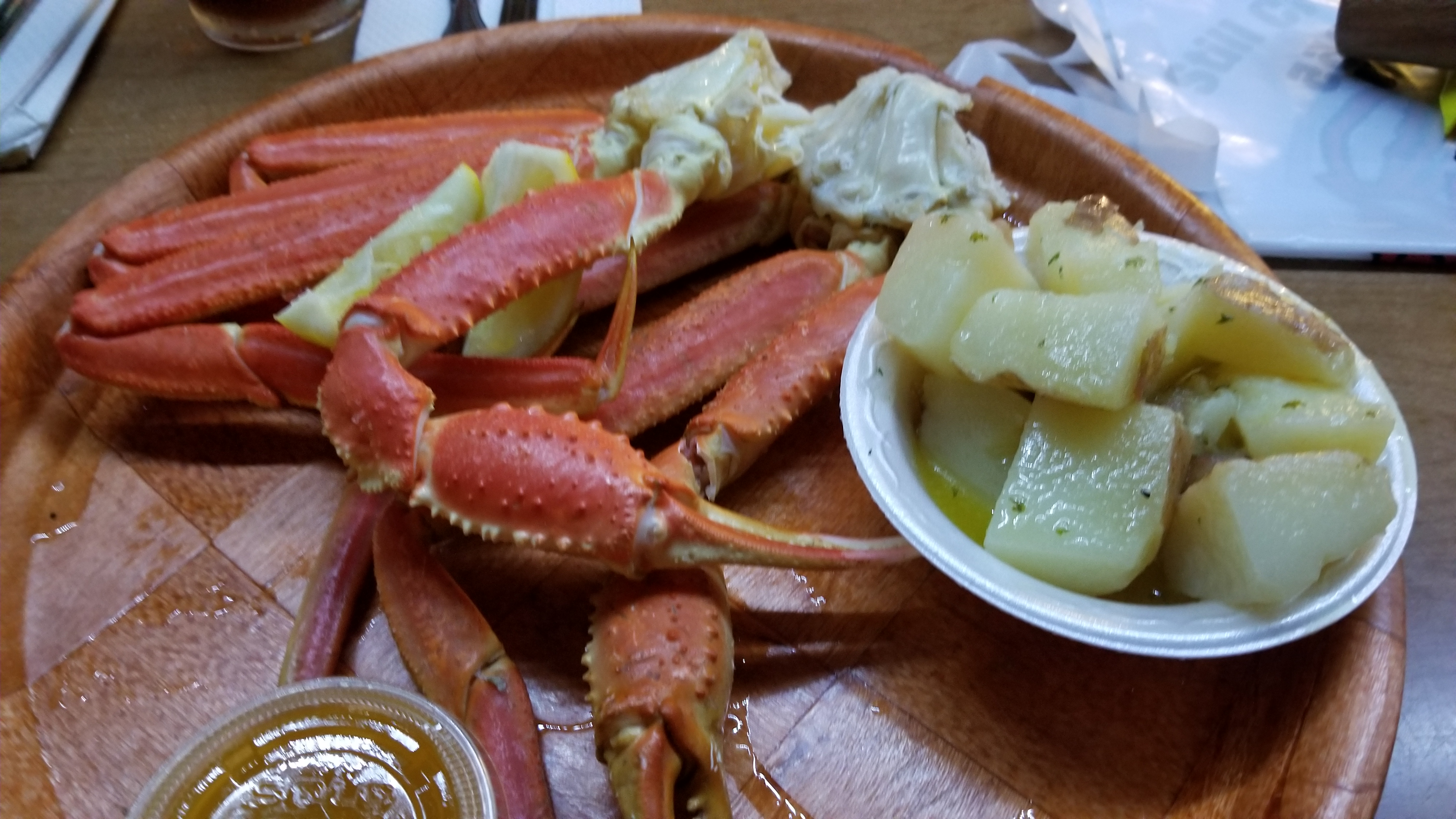
Food from Rustic Inn

The Rustic Inn is a restaurant in Fort Lauderdale, Florida in the United States. It was established in 1955 by Henry Oreal and his brother-in-law Burton Wayne McDonald.

The restaurant features waterfront dining on a dock. It also has a barge, cocktail lounge, and dining room.
